Sandbach may refer to:

Places
Sandbach, a market town in Cheshire, England
Sandbach railway station, a railway station serving Sandbach
Sandbach services, a motorway service station on the M6
Sandbach (Acher), a river in Baden-Württemberg, Germany
Sandbach, Breuberg, a town in Hesse, Germany

People
Antoinette Sandbach (born 1969), British politician
Arthur Sandbach (1859–1928), British Army general officer 
Charles Sandbach (1909–1990), British footballer
Chris Sandbach (born 1985), English cricketer
Harry Sandbach (1903–1991), British classical scholar
Margaret Sandbach (1812–1852), British poet and novelist
Samuel Sandbach (1769–1851), British politician